Earl of Stockton is a title in the peerage of the United Kingdom. It was created on 24 February 1984 for Harold Macmillan, the former Conservative prime minister (from 1957 to 1963), less than three years before his death in 1986. At the same time a courtesy title was conferred for the earl's heir apparent: Viscount Macmillan of Ovenden, of Chelwood Gate in the County of East Sussex and of Stockton-on-Tees in the County of Cleveland.

 the titles are held by the first holder's grandson, being the second earl, who succeeded in 1986 on his grandfather's death (namely Alexander Macmillan, 2nd Earl of Stockton, son of Maurice Macmillan, Viscount Macmillan of Ovenden, only son of the first earl, who died in 1984).

The earldom and viscountcy are the most recent hereditary peerages created outside of the royal family and the only such titles which survive of the few created since 1965.

The family seat was Birch Grove, near Chelwood Gate, East Sussex, but it was sold by the 2nd Earl in 1989.

Earls of Stockton (1984)
 (Maurice) Harold Macmillan, 1st Earl of Stockton (1894–1986)
 Alexander Daniel Alan Macmillan, 2nd Earl of Stockton (born 1943)

The heir apparent is the present holder's only son, Daniel Maurice Alan Macmillan, Viscount Macmillan of Ovenden (b. 1974).

Line of succession

 (Maurice) Harold Macmillan, 1st Earl of Stockton (1894–1986)
Maurice Victor Macmillan, Viscount Macmillan of Ovenden (1921–1984)
 Alexander Daniel Alan Macmillan, 2nd Earl of Stockton (born 1943)
(1)  Daniel Maurice Alan Macmillan, Viscount Macmillan of Ovenden (b. 1974)
Hon. Adam Julian Robert Macmillan (1948–2016)
(2)  Frederick Maurice Brian Macmillan (b. 1990)
(3)  Joshua Gabriel P. Macmillan (b. 1995)
(4)  Hon. David Maurice Benjamin Macmillan (b. 1957)
(5)  Finn Joshua Marcus Macmillan (b. 1995)

References

Bibliography
Kidd, Charles, Williamson, David (editors). Debrett's Peerage and Baronetage (1990 edition). New York: St Martin's Press, 1990.

 
Earldoms in the Peerage of the United Kingdom
1984 establishments in the United Kingdom
Noble titles created in 1984
Peerages created for the Prime Minister of the United Kingdom
Noble titles created for UK MPs